This list is for notable people who ranked field marshal, general or brigadier in the Sri Lanka Army including the Ceylon Army and Ceylon Defense Force. It is not complete – please add to it if you know of any omissions.

Hence, in the lists below:
 5* = Field marshal
 4* = General
 3* = Lieutenant general
 2* = Major general
 1* = Brigadier

Field marshal

Field Marshal Sarath Fonseka

General

Regular Force
General Deshamanya Sepala Attygalle
General T. I. Weerathunga
General Cyril Ranatunga
General Deshamanya Denis Perera
General Nalin Seneviratne
General Cecil Waidyaratne
General Hamilton Wanasinghe
General Rohan Daluwatte
General Srilal Weerasooriya
General L. P. Balagalle
General Shantha Kottegoda
General Jagath Jayasuriya
General Daya Ratnayake
General Crishantha de Silva
General Mahesh Senanayake
General Kamal Gunaratne
General Shavendra Silva

Generals of the Volunteer Force
Three former members of the volunteer force have been awarded the honorary rank of General of the Sri Lanka Army Volunteer Force.
 General Sir John Kotelawala — Former Prime Minister of Ceylon and Minister of Defense and External Affairs.
 General Ranjan Wijeratne — Former Minister of Foreign Affairs and State Minister for Defence.
 General Anuruddha Ratwatte — Former Minister of Power and Energy and Deputy Minister for Defence

Lieutenant general 

Lieutenant General Denzil Kobbekaduwa
Lieutenant General Parami Kulatunga
Lieutenant General Nalin Angammana
Lieutenant General Henry Athukorale (Retired - Deceased)
Lieutenant General Vikum Liyanage (Serving)

Major general

1950 - 1969 
 Major General Anton Muttukumaru (Retired - Deceased) 
 Major General H. W. G. Wijeyekoon (Retired - Deceased)
 Major General Richard Udugama (Retired - Deceased)
 Major General Bertram Heyn (Retired - Deceased)

1970 - 1999 
Major General C. H. Fernando (Retired - Deceased) 
Major General Jayantha de S. Jayaratne (Deceased)
Major General Y. Balaretnarajah (Retired)
Major General Larry Wijeratne 
Major General Tilak Paranagama (Retired)
Major General Lakshman Algama (Retired - Assassinated)
Major General Vijaya Wimalaratne
Major General Lucky Wijayaratne 
Major General Gemunu Kulatunge (Retired - Deceased)
Major General Janaka Perera (Retired - Assassinated)
Major General T. N. De Silva (Retired)
Major General Dr. Chelliah Thurairaja (Retired)
Major General Nihal Jayakody (Deceased)

2000 - present 
Major General Percy Fernando
Major General Prasanna Chandrasekera (Retired)
Major General D. S. K. Wijesooriya (Retired)
Major General D. W. Hapuarachchi (Retired)
Major General Jaliya Nammuni (Retired)
Major General Ananda Weerasekara (Retired)
Major General H. Somadasa Hapuarachchi (Retired-Deceased)
Major General Daya Wijeyesinghe (Retired - Deceased)
Major General D. R. Aruna B. Jayatilleke (Deceased)
Major General W. A. Asoka De Silva (Retired)
Major General Sanath Karunaratne (Retired)
Major General Chandana Rajaguru (Retired)
Major General E. H. Samaratunga (Retired)
Major General G.V.D. Udaya Perera (Retired)
Major General Tuan Fadyl Meedin (Retired)
Major General Lalith Daulagala (Retired)
Major General L. L. A. Fernando (Retired)
Major General Ranjith de Silva (Retired)
Major General Sumith Balasuriya (Retired - Deceased)
Major General  MHP Mihindukulasuriya(Retired)

Major General Kumudu Perera (Retired)
Major General Chagi Gallage (Retired)
Major General Laksiri A. D. Amaratunge (Retired)
Major General K. A. M. G. Kularatne (Retired - Deceased)
Major General Jayanath C. P. Lokuketagodage (Retired)
Major General Parakrama Pannipitiya (Retired)
Major General Athula Jayawardane (Retired)
Major General Nandana Udawatta (Retired)
Major General D. Kalupahana (Retired)
Major General Udaya Nanayakkara (Retired)
Major General G. L. Sigera (Retired -Deceased)
Major General Susantha Mendis   
Major General Ananda Hamangoda 
Major General Saliya Kulatunge (Retired - Deceased)
Major General Lalith Wijetunge (Retired)
Major General Janaka Walgama
Major General Nirmal Dharmaratne
Major General Ravi Ratnasingam
Major General Sumedha Perera (Retired)
Major General Lalith Abeywardena (Retired)
Major General Nandana Senadeera
Major General Ashok Weerasinghe (Retired)
Major General S. M. Asoka Jayawardena (Retired)
Major General Kamal Fernando (Retired - Deceased)
Major General P. M. R. Bandara (Retired)
Major General Samantha Sooriyabandara (Retired - Deceased)
Major General Jagath Dias (Retired)
Major General  Athula Galagamage  (Retired)
Major General Prasanna de Silva (Retired)
Major General Laksiri Waduge (Retired
Major General Dammi Hewage
Major General Duleep Wickremanayake (Retired)
Major General M. K. D. Perera
Major General Kithsiri Malporu (Retired)
Major General Rasika Fernando
Major General Jagath Gunawardena
Major General  W. L. P. W. Perera
Major General Subashana Welikala (Deceased)
Major General KAP Jagath Ratnayake
Major General Priyanka Fernando
Major General K.P.Nugegoda (Retired)
Major General K.A.D.Sanath L.Perera (Retired)

Brigadier

1950 - 1969 
Brigadier Christopher Allan Hector Perera Jayawardena (Retired - Deceased)
Brigadier Herbert Clifford Serasinghe (Retired - Deceased)

1970 - 1999 
Brigadier P. D. Ramayanayake (Retired - Deceased)
Brigadier E. T. De Z Abeysekera (Retired - Deceased)
Brigadier Leonard Merlyn Wickramasuriya (Retired - Deceased)
Brigadier T. S. B. Sally (Retired - Deceased)
Brigadier S. B. Miyanadeniya (Retired - Deceased)
Brigadier J. G. Balthazar (Retired - Deceased)
Brigadier Ariyasinghe Ariyapperuma
Brigadier B. K. V. J. E. Rodrigo (Retired - Deceased)
Brigadier Dennis Hapugalle (Retired - Deceased)
Brigadier G. R. Jayasinghe (Retired)
Brigadier Donald Hewagama (Retired)
Brigadier Nimal Fernando (Retired)
Brigadier R. T. Tambiah (Retired - Deceased)

2000 - present 
Brigadier C.S.D. Gunasinghe
Brigadier Bhathiya Jayatilleka
Brigadier Rohitha Neil Akmeemana

Brigadier S.B. Miyanadeniya

Brigadier S.A.M.T. Seneviratne (Deceased)

Brigadier M. H. Gunaratne
Brigadier R. M. Jayasinghe
Brigadier Nihal Hapuarachchi
Brigadier Parry Liyanage
Brigadier Udaya Ariyarathna
Brigadier Gamini Angammana
Brigadier Sarath Embawa
Brigadier D.N. Wijesuriya (Retired - Deceased)
Brigadier J. S. U. Katugampola
Brigadier Sudantha Thilakarathne
Brigadier Sanjaya Wanasinghe
Brigadier D H M R B Tammita

Colonel 
 Colonel A.F. Lafir
 Colonel C. A. Dharmapala
 Colonel Maurice de Mel

References

Generals
Sri Lankan